Rhectosemia argentipunctalis is a moth in the family Crambidae. It was described by Herbert Druce in 1895. It is found in the Mexican state of Veracruz and Guatemala.

References

Spilomelinae
Moths described in 1895